VCV Rack is a free and open-source cross-platform software modular synthesizer.

Overview 
VCV Rack is a free open-source virtual modular synthesizer: multiple modules can be connected to synthesize a sound. By default, the software contains several VCOs, LFOs, mixers, and other standard synthesizer modules. However, more can be added as plugins through the VCV Rack website.

Version 1.0.0 added a stable API, a multithreading engine and support for polyphonic signals.

Version 2.0.0 was officially announced in September of 2021 and released in November 30, 2021.

Interconnectivity 
In addition to the above features, VCV Rack can also connect to other hardware and software by outputting analog CV/gate and digital USB or MIDI signals. The software can also connect to other VST plugins though the module "host". The ability to use VCV Rack itself as a VST plugin within other audio applications was added upon the release of Rack 2.0.

References

External links
VCV Rack website

Free music software
Free software programmed in C++
Cross-platform software
Cross-platform free software
Modular synthesizers
Open source software synthesizers